Chappetts Copse is a   nature reserve east of West Meon in Hampshire. It is owned and managed by the Hampshire and Isle of Wight Wildlife Trust.

This ancient ash and beech wood has many rare fungi and plants. Orchids include broad-leaved helleborine and bird's-nest, and there are butterflies such as the speckled wood and silver-washed fritillary.

References

Hampshire and Isle of Wight Wildlife Trust